Charles John Hill (6 September 1918 — 22 December 1998), also known as Midge Hill, was a Welsh professional footballer who played as an inside forward.

Career
Born in Cardiff, Hill began his career with his hometown club Cardiff City in 1938 after playing amateur level for his local club Bridgend Street of Splott Cardiff . However, the outbreak of World War II interrupted his early career but he returned to play for Cardiff after the war. He struggled to maintain a place in the first team as the side won promotion from the Third Division South and was allowed to join Torquay United in 1947.

He went on to make 63 league appearances for Torquay before joining Queens Park Rangers in 1950. He later had spells with Swindon Town and Barry Town.

References

1918 births
1998 deaths
Welsh footballers
Footballers from Cardiff
Cardiff City F.C. players
Torquay United F.C. players
Queens Park Rangers F.C. players
Swindon Town F.C. players
Barry Town United F.C. players
English Football League players
Association football forwards